The Little Silver School District is a community public school district that serves students in pre-kindergarten through eighth grade from Little Silver, in Monmouth County, New Jersey, United States.

As of the 2021–22 school year, the district, comprised of two schools, had an enrollment of 776 students and 77.8 classroom teachers (on an FTE basis), for a student–teacher ratio of 10.0:1.

The district is classified by the New Jersey Department of Education as being in District Factor Group "J", the-highest of eight groupings. District Factor Groups organize districts statewide to allow comparison by common socioeconomic characteristics of the local districts. From lowest socioeconomic status to highest, the categories are A, B, CD, DE, FG, GH, I and J.

For ninth through twelfth grades, students attend Red Bank Regional High School, which serves students from the boroughs of Little Silver, Red Bank and Shrewsbury, along with students in the district's academy programs from other communities who are eligible to attend on a tuition basis. Students from other Monmouth County municipalities are eligible to attend the high school for its performing arts program, with admission on a competitive basis. The borough has two elected representatives on the nine-member Board of Education. As of the 2021–22 school year, the high school had an enrollment of 1,247 students and 117.8 classroom teachers (on an FTE basis), for a student–teacher ratio of 10.6:1.

Schools
Schools in the district (with 2021–22 enrollment data from the National Center for Education Statistics) are:
Elementary school
Point Road School with 393 students in grades PreK-4
Dr. Kathleen Stigliano, Principal
Middle school
Markham Place School with 380 students in grades 5-8
Anthonio Pepe, Principal

Administration
Core members of the district's administration are:
Eric Platt, Superintendent
Caryn Anderson, Business Administrator / Board Secretary

Board of education
The district's board of education, comprised of seven members, sets policy and oversees the fiscal and educational operation of the district through its administration. As a Type II school district, the board's trustees are elected directly by voters to serve three-year terms of office on a staggered basis, with either two or three seats up for election each year held (since 2012) as part of the November general election. The board appoints a superintendent to oversee the district's day-to-day operations and a business administrator to supervise the business functions of the district.

References

External links
Little Silver School District

School Data for the Little Silver School District, National Center for Education Statistics
Red Bank Regional High School

School Data for the Red Bank Regional High School, National Center for Education Statistics

Little Silver, New Jersey
New Jersey District Factor Group J
School districts in Monmouth County, New Jersey